Wreckers: Tread & Circuits is an American limited comic book series written by David Mariotte, drawn by Jack Lawrence, colored by Candice Han and Brittany Peer, and published by IDW Publishing. Based on the Transformers franchise by Hasbro and Takara-Tomy, the series is set in the same continuity of the 2019 mainline comic book.

The series debuted on October 13, 2021, and concluded on January 12, 2022.

Premise 
The Wreckers are a secret operation team that infiltrates in Speedia 500, a space racing tournament in planet Velocitron, in order to stop a terrorist organization called Mayhem, without exposing their cover as extreme acrobats.

Publication history

Background 
Transformers was first announced by IDW Publishing on December 18, 2018. The title is written by Brian Ruckley, and was initially illustrated by Angel Hernandez and Cachét Whitman, and started publishing issues twice-monthly in March 2019. Ruckley described the writing opportunity as a "privilege", and stated that the title would be a great opportunity for new readers to familiarize themselves with the universe and characters of the Transformers franchise, which he describes as of the "biggest [and] best that science fiction has to offer".

Development 
In July 2021, IDW Publishing announced the comic book limited series Wreckers: Tread & Circuits, written by IDW editor David Mariotte, drawn by Transformers: Lost Light artist Jack Lawrence and colored by Candice Han.

Mariotte said, “the Wreckers are an idea that comes from the comics—a team of Autobots willing to do what other Autobots wouldn't, and look cool as heck while doing it. Every iteration has been a bit different, and with Jack and Candice on art, this one's going to be a gorgeous new take on who the Wreckers are and how they do what they do best.”

Lawrence said, “I was collecting the UK Transformers comic when the first Wreckers story was published in 1986, and it’s so awesome to actually contribute to their legend. The Wreckers have always felt like a pulp adventure team, and I'm excited to bring some of that feeling to these pages.”

The series concluded on January 12, 2022 after four issues.

Issues

Reception

Collected edition

References 

Comics based on Hasbro toys
Transformers comics